The New Democratic Party ran a full slate of candidates in the 1980 Canadian federal election, and won 32 seats to remain the third-largest party in the House of Commons of Canada. Information about the party's candidates may be found here.

Ontario

Don Gray (Hamilton East)
Gray was a steelworker and an alderman in Hamilton, representing the city's fourth ward. He held several positions on city council, including chair of the Finance Committee, chair of the Hamilton Harbour Committee, chair the management committee responsible for the construction of Copps Coliseum, and chair of a committee that drafted a 1981 freedom-of-information by-law. Gray was an early opponent of highway construction in the Red Hill Valley, and voted against the measure in September 1979. He lost his council seat in the 1985 municipal election.

References